The 1980 Minnesota House of Representatives election was held in the U.S. state of Minnesota on November 4, 1980, to elect members to the House of Representatives of the 72nd Minnesota Legislature. A primary election was held on September 9, 1980.

The Minnesota Democratic–Farmer–Labor Party (DFL) won a majority of seats, remaining the majority party, followed by the Independent-Republicans of Minnesota. The new Legislature convened on January 6, 1981.

Background
The last election resulted in the DFL and Independent-Republicans winning an equal number of seats. Under an agreement reached between the two parties, the Republicans would be given the speakership, the chairs of the divisions of the appropriations and tax committees, and a one-vote majority on the divisions of the tax committee. The DFL would be given the chairs and a one-vote majority on the rules and tax committees as well as the chair of the appropriations committee. The chairs and membership of the remaining committees would be equally divided.

This arrangement would last until the end of the legislative session in May 1979, when the DFL obtained a majority after the House removed Republican member Bob Pavlak from office on a straight party-line vote, declaring that he violated the Minnesota Fair Campaign Practices Act and therefore was not legally elected. Pavlak was legally barred from casting their vote on matters relating to his contested election, allowing the motion to remove him to pass. Pavlak ran in the resulting special election for his former seat held on June 19, 1979, losing to DFL candidate Frank Rodriguez.
 
After obtaining a majority, the DFL caucus voted to support caucus leader Irv Anderson to be speaker. However, some DFL members who felt were punished by Anderson "for prior policy disagreements or for personal reasons by denying them the committee positions in 1979 that they had expected by virtue of experience and geography" were opposed to electing him speaker. A group of 26 DFL members, led by Gordon Voss and Fred Norton, formed a coalition with the Republicans, electing Norton speaker in 1980.

Results

Aftermath
Although Irv Anderson was the leader of the DFL caucus, DFL representative Harry Sieben sought the support of the DFL caucus to be speaker. Believing that Anderson would have trouble leading a divided caucus following the election of Fred Norton as speaker, Sieben convinced Anderson to support him. Sieben and Norton tied on the first ballot, each receiving 35 votes. After two more ballots, Sieben won the unanimous support of the caucus.

See also
 Minnesota Senate election, 1980
 Minnesota gubernatorial election, 1978

References

Bibliography
 

1980 Minnesota elections
Minnesota House of Representatives elections
Minnesota